Corduroy are an English four-piece acid jazz outfit based in London, formed around twins Ben Addison (drums/vocals) and Scott Addison (keyboards/vocals), who were previously in Sire Records act Boys Wonder (Scott had been guitarist with Boys Wonder, while Ben had been the lead vocalist). Joining the twins in the band are Richard Searle and guitarist Simon Nelson-Smith. Searle had been bass player with Doctor and the Medics, who topped the UK Singles Chart in 1986 with a cover version of "Spirit in the Sky". Searle had joined the Addison twins in the final incarnation of Boys Wonder, before the band gradually evolved into Corduroy in 1991, initially forming for a one-off New Year's Eve party.

The self-dubbed "fabric four" primarily recorded in a film soundtrack style, and many of their tracks were instrumentals. On the release of their first album Dad Man Cat, Paul Moody wrote in the New Musical Express: "Whereas the rest of the Acid Jazz roster fidget around in a world of skinny ribbed roll-necks comparing sideburn growth, Corduroy manage to swagger through the same po-faced domain with a couldn't-care-less braggadocio... Corduroy have got their collective tongue stuck firmly in someone else's cheek here and it feels staggeringly good."

Releasing three albums on Eddie Piller's Acid Jazz Records, they received radio airplay for their single "Something in My Eye" in 1993, but national chart success evaded them, although several singles from their 1993 album High Havoc charted in the UK Independent Chart. Their 1994 album, Out of Here, reached number 73 in the UK Albums Chart.

They remained a popular live attraction, particularly on the college circuit. They also gained a healthy following in Japan, making the first of several trips to the country in 1993, and the following year they recorded a live album, Quattro - Live in Japan. After leaving Acid Jazz Records they signed to Big Cat Records, releasing two further albums:  The New You! (April 1997) and the Rob Playford produced Clik! (August 1999). But when they discovered that their record label, Big Cat, had been dropped by their owner V2, Corduroy decided to split up.

Corduroy reformed and played two sell-out nights at the Jazz Cafe in Camden, London, on 16 and 17 June 2007. Searle was not involved with this incarnation of the band, working under the name of Corduroy Industries. News  on their Myspace site also stated that they had completed an album of Motown covers.

Ben has also released an album of Beatles covers under the name of 'Ben from Corduroy'.

Corduroy performed a show on 17 April 2017 as the last night headliners of Le Beat Bespoké 2017 weekender at 229 The Venue in London, where they premiered 4 new songs from an upcoming album.

In 2018 Corduroy announced their first album in 18 years entitled Return of the Fabric Four which was praised by Record Collector's Lois Wilson as being "groovy" and "thrilling".

Discography

Albums 
Dad Man Cat (1992) Acid Jazz JAZID 60
High Havoc (1993) Acid Jazz JAZID 85
Out of Here (1994) Acid Jazz JAZID 107
The New You! (April 1997) Big Cat ABB 139
Clik! (July 1999) Big Cat ABB 1008391
Quattro - Live in Japan 1994 (2001) Castle Music
Return of the Fabric Four (2018) Acid Jazz AJXLP439

Compilations 
Mini!: The Best of Corduroy (1998) Music Club
London, England (2001) Castle Music
The Fabric Four: The Best of Corduroy (2002) Felicity
Something in My Eye: The Best of Corduroy (2004) Castle Music
Very Yeah - The Director's Cut: Complete Compositions 1992-1996 (2013) Cherry Red       
Rare Stock : Rarities From The Corduroy Vaults (2019) Acid Jazz
Winky Wagon: Best of the Psy-Fi Years (2019) Well Suspect Records
Winky Wagon 2 (2021) Well Suspect Records

Singles 
Something in My Eye (1993) Acid Jazz JAZID 68
The Frighteners (1993) Acid Jazz JAZID 80
Motorhead (1993) Acid Jazz JAZID 95
Mini (1994) Acid Jazz JAZID 105
The Joker is Wild (1997) Big Cat ABB 129
Moshi Moshi (1999) Big Cat ABB 5007353
Thing For Love (1999) Big Cat ABB 5008836

References

External links
 Official Corduroy Website
 Ready Steady Go
 Listen To Now What Earthman by Boys Wonder
 Corduroy @ Discogs

Acid jazz ensembles
Musical groups from London
English dance music groups
Musical groups established in 1991
Musical groups disestablished in 1999
1991 establishments in England
1999 disestablishments in England
Acid Jazz Records artists